New Writings in SF 1 is an anthology of science fiction short stories edited by John Carnell, the initial volume in a series of thirty, of which he edited the first twenty-one. It was first published in hardcover by Dennis Dobson in 1964, followed by a paperback edition issued the same year by Corgi, and an American paperback edition under the slightly variant title New Writings in S-F 1 by Bantam Books in April 1966. Selections from this volume, together with others from volumes 2-4 of the series, were later included in The Best from New Writings in SF, issued by Dobson in 1971 and Corgi in 1972.

The book collects five novelettes and short stories by various science fiction authors, with a foreword by Carnell.

Contents
"Foreword" (John Carnell)
"Key to Chaos" (Edward Mackin)
"Two's Company" (John Rankine)
"Man on Bridge" (Brian W. Aldiss)
"Haggard Honeymoon" (Joseph Green and James Webbert)
"The Sea's Furthest End" (Damien Broderick)

External links

1964 anthologies
01